Ilyas Ahmed may refer to the following:

 Ilyas Ahmed (East Pakistan cricketer), Pakistani cricketer for East Pakistan
 Ilyas Ahmed (Kuwaiti cricketer) (born 1990)